Longepi is a genus of Australian white tailed spiders that was first described by Norman I. Platnick in 2000.

Species
 it contains eight species:
Longepi barmah Platnick, 2000 – Eastern Australia
Longepi bondi Platnick, 2000 – Australia (New South Wales, Victoria)
Longepi boyd Platnick, 2000 (type) – Australia (New South Wales, Australian Capital Territory)
Longepi canungra Platnick, 2000 – Australia (Queensland)
Longepi cobon Platnick, 2000 – Australia (Victoria)
Longepi durin Platnick, 2000 – Australia (Western Australia)
Longepi tarra Platnick, 2000 – Australia (Victoria)
Longepi woodman Platnick, 2000 – Southern Australia

See also
 List of Lamponidae species

References

Araneomorphae genera
Lamponidae
Spiders of Australia